is a Japanese surname and masculine given name.

People with the surname include:

, Japanese diplomat
, Japanese wrestler
, Japanese voice actress 
, Japanese Olympic runner

People with the given name include:
, Japanese scholar

See also
Kōhei (given name), another possible reading of the characters  or 

Japanese-language surnames
Japanese masculine given names